Paula Bernadette Flannery (born 27 May 1974) is a New Zealand former cricketer who played as a right-handed batter. She appeared in 1 Test match, 17 One Day Internationals and 1 Twenty20 International for New Zealand between 2000 and 2004. She played domestic cricket for Canterbury and Otago, as well as spending one season with Kent. Following her playing career, Flannery has coached girls' cricket in Christchurch.

References

External links

1974 births
Living people
People from Clyde, New Zealand
New Zealand women cricketers
New Zealand women Test cricketers
New Zealand women One Day International cricketers
New Zealand women Twenty20 International cricketers
Canterbury Magicians cricketers
Otago Sparks cricketers
Kent women cricketers